Tacparia is a genus of moths in the family Geometridae erected by Francis Walker in 1860.

Species
Tacparia zalissaria Walker, 1860
Tacparia atropunctata (Packard, 1874)
Tacparia detersata (Guenée, 1857)

References

Geometridae